Alívio Imediato (English: "Immediate Relief") is the first live album by Brazilian Rock band Engenheiros do Hawaii, released in 1989. Recorded live at Canecão, at Rio de Janeiro, in July 1989, the album brings great hits like  A Revolta dos Dândis  ( the two parts),  Infinite Highway , Infinita Highway, Toda Forma de Poder e Somos Quem Podemos Ser.

Tracks
Nº	Título	Compositor(es)		Duração	
1.	"Nau à Deriva"  	 	Inédita	3:30
2.	"Alívio Imediato"  	 	Inédita	3:44
3.	"A Revolta dos Dândis (Parte 1)"  	 		6:38
4.	"A Revolta dos Dândis (Parte 2)"  	 		4:00
5.	"Infinita Highway"  	 		7:23
6.	"A Verdade a Ver Navios"  	 		1:06
7.	"Toda Forma de Poder"  	 		4:28
8.	"Terra de Gigantes"  	 		5:47
9.	"Somos Quem Podemos Ser"  	 		3:05
10.	"Ouça o que Eu Digo: Não Ouça Ninguém"  	 		4:19
11.	"Longe Demais das Capitais"  	 		6:31

Singles
Alívio Imediato
Nau à Deriva

Personnel
Humberto Gessinger: Voice, bass and electric guitar
Augusto Licks: Electric guitar, guitar, keyboards and vocals
Carlos Maltz: Drums

References

1986 debut albums
Engenheiros do Hawaii albums